Giacomo Patri (1898–1978) was an Italian-born American artist and teacher.

Based in San Francisco, Patri taught at the California Labor School following World War II.  Due to its pro-labor agenda, the school was closed in the 1950s under the pressures of McCarthyism.

In 1938, after three years of work, Patri produced the wordless novel White Collar using linocut printing.  It chronicled the aftermath of the 1929 stock market crash, and was intended to motivate white-collar workers to unionize.  Woodcut artist and fellow wordless novelist Lynd Ward reviewed the book in Office and Professional Workers News in 1941.

From 1948 until 1966, Patri ran his own art school.

References

Works cited

 

1898 births
1978 deaths
American artists
Artists from the San Francisco Bay Area
People from Arquata Scrivia
Italian emigrants to the United States